Jean-Luc Bitton (born in 1959 in Lyon, France) is a writer, journalist and author. Together with Raymond Cousse and Jean-Yves Reuzeau, he wrote Emmanuel Bove : La Vie Comme une Ombre, a biography of the writer Emmanuel Bove. He also participated in the creation of the Bove segment on the television series "A Century of Writers" (1997) and has created a website devoted entirely to Bove. He will also be the first biographer of French poet Jacques Rigaut, in a forthcoming book scheduled for publication in 2014. He has published articles in the journals Jungle, Perpendicular, The Series, the Nouvelle Revue Française and Rue Saint Ambrose.

Works
Emmanuel Bove : La Vie Comme une Ombre, with Raymond Cousse and Jean-Yves Reuzeau. Preface by Peter Handke. Castor Astral (1994)   
Nos Amours. Un Siècle de Lettres d'Amour, Flammarion (2001)  
La Mer de la Tranquillité: Images, with Dolorès Marat, Les Petits Matins (2005) 

1959 births
French journalists
Living people
French male non-fiction writers